Jenkintown is a borough in Montgomery County, Pennsylvania. It is approximately 10 miles (16 km) north of Center City Philadelphia.

History

The community was named for William Jenkins, a Welsh pioneer settler.

Jenkintown is located just outside Philadelphia along the Route 611 corridor between Abington and Cheltenham Townships. Today, the Borough is approximately 0.58 square miles and is home to 4,500 residents.

The borough is a mostly residential community that is separated into East and West by the Business District that runs along and surrounds Old York Road (Route 611) corridor. On the east side of Old York Road, residential development is predominantly characterized by larger detached single-family homes on lots larger than the Borough average. On the southeast side of York Road, there is a small mixed concentration of row homes, duplexes, and single-family residences. The majority of the residential development, however, is located to the west of York Road. This area consists of a traditional small town mix of detached single-family homes, duplexes ("twins"), and row homes. Located throughout this area are several multi-family apartment buildings that are residential condominium or rental properties. At the center of this residential area are the Jenkintown Elementary School and the Jenkintown High School.

Until its 2023 consolidation into a single volunteer department, the Jenkintown Fire Department consisted of two fire companies, each founded more than 125 years ago. The Jenkintown Fire Department is a totally volunteer department. Prior to consolidation, it consisted of the Pioneer Fire Company #1 and the Independent Fire Company #2. The Pioneer Company was organized in 1884 and the Independent Company was organized in 1889, an artifact of the historical split between Catholics and Protestants in the population of the borough. The Jenkintown Fire Department has a total membership of approximately 150 with 50 members composing the active firefighting crew.

Elements of the British army passed through Jenkintown en route to the Battle of White Marsh in early December 1777.

The Jenkins' Town Lyceum Building, Jenkintown-Wyncote station, and Strawbridge and Clothier Store are listed on the National Register of Historic Places.

Geography
Jenkintown borough is located at  (40.096060, -75.129415). Jenkintown is surrounded by Abington Township to the north, west, and east, and borders Cheltenham Township to the south.

Education
The Jenkintown School District includes Jenkintown Elementary School and Jenkintown Middle/High School. The district has an enrollment of over 700 students.

St. Joseph the Protector Regional Catholic School in Glenside and Abington Township is the area Catholic school. It was formed in 2012 by the merger of Immaculate Conception School in Jenkintown and St. Luke the Evangelist School in Glenside.

Abington Friends School is an independent Quaker school in nearby Abington, Pennsylvania, serving students from age 3 to grade 12. Abington Friends School has stood on its original campus in Abington Township since 1697.

Manor College (est. 1947) is a private Catholic college founded by the Byzantine Ukrainian Sisters of Saint Basil the Great. It is affiliated with the Ukrainian Greek Catholic Church.

Demographics

As of the 2010 census, the borough was 87.5% White, 5.7% Black or African American, 2.0% Asian, and 1.8% were two or more races. 3.0% of the population were of Hispanic or Latino ancestry.

As of the census of 2000, there were 4,478 people, 2,035 households, and 1,088 families residing in the borough. The population density was 7,844.0 people per square mile (3,033.3/km2). There were 2,085 housing units at an average density of 3,652.2 per square mile (1,412.3/km2). The racial makeup of the borough was 93.61% White, 4.00% African American, 0.04% Native American, 0.94% Asian, 0.02% Pacific Islander, 0.49% from other races, and 0.89% from two or more races. Hispanic or Latino of any race were 1.30% of the population.

There were 2,035 households, out of which 24.3% had children under the age of 18 living with them, 42.2% were married couples living together, 8.6% had a female householder with no husband present, and 46.5% were non-families. 40.6% of all households were made up of individuals, and 19.3% had someone living alone who was 65 years of age or older. The average household size was 2.19 and the average family size was 3.08.

The age distribution of the borough's population is spread out, with 22.9% under the age of 18, 5.6% from 18 to 24, 27.0% from 25 to 44, 23.5% from 45 to 64, and 21.0% who were 65 years of age or older. The median age was 42 years. For every 100 females, there were 78.9 males. For every 100 females age 18 and over, there were 73.2 males.

The median income for a household in the borough was $47,743, and the median income for a family was $72,902. Males had a median income of $41,970 versus $35,625 for females. The per capita income for the borough was $29,834. About 1.9% of families and 5.1% of the population were below the poverty line, including 3.6% of those under age 18 and 7.2% of those age 65 or over.

Transportation

PA Route 611 heads north–south through Jenkintown along Old York Road, heading south to Philadelphia and north to Willow Grove, where it has an interchange with the Pennsylvania Turnpike and Doylestown. PA Route 73 passes east–west along the southern edge of Jenkintown along Washington Lane and Township Line Road, heading west to Wyncote and east to Northeast Philadelphia. Greenwood Avenue runs east–west through the center of Jenkintown, heading west to Wyncote.

The Jenkintown-Wyncote station is one of SEPTA's major Regional Rail stops; the Lansdale/Doylestown Line, Warminster Line, and West Trenton Line regional rail services all stop there. Jenkintown-Wyncote station is the busiest SEPTA Regional Rail station outside the city of Philadelphia. The Jenkintown-Wyncote station building with its Queen Anne-style architecture was designed by famous Philadelphia architect Horace Trumbauer. SEPTA provides City Bus service to Jenkintown along Route 55, which follows PA 611 south to Olney Transportation Center in North Philadelphia and north to Willow Grove and Doylestown, and Route 77, which heads west to the Chestnut Hill section of Philadelphia and east to Northeast Philadelphia.

Politics and government

Jenkintown has a city manager form of government with a mayor and a twelve-member borough council.  The current mayor is Gabriel Lerman.  Jay Conners is the President of Borough Council, and Christian Soltysiak is vice president.

The borough is part of the Fourth Congressional District, represented by Madeleine Dean. At the state level, Jenkintown is part of the Pennsylvania's 154th Representative District, represented by Napoleon Nelson, and the 4th Senatorial District, represented by Arthur L. Haywood III. All are Democrats. Jenkintown, like its surroundings of Abington and Cheltenham and their included towns, votes overwhelmingly Democratic.

In popular culture
The television sitcom The Goldbergs is set in Jenkintown; it is based on the 1980s childhood of show creator Adam F. Goldberg, a Jenkintown native.

Notable people
 Bryan Cohen (born 1989), American-Israeli basketball player
Bradley Cooper, actor and filmmaker
Lawrence Curry, educator and politician
Adam F. Goldberg, television and film producer; creator of The Goldbergs, which is set in Jenkintown
George Low Jr., professional golfer 
George Low Sr., professional golfer
Carol Polis, (born 1947), professional boxing judge
Ezra Pound, poet and critic
Lessing J. Rosenwald, businessman, collector of rare books and art, chess patron, and philanthropist; chairman and president of Sears, Roebuck and Company
Max Ritter, Olympic swimmer 
Allyson Schwartz, politician

Gallery

References

External links

 Borough of Jenkintown

 
1874 establishments in Pennsylvania
Boroughs in Montgomery County, Pennsylvania
Populated places established in 1697